NE Pacific Mall is a shopping mall located along Maharlika Highway in Brgy. Hermogenes Concepcion, Cabanatuan, Nueva Ecija, Philippines. It was developed by Landco Pacific Corporation and was managed by the NE Group of Companies which also developed the Lakewood City Golf Course and Residential Complex and NE Mall both located in the city.

In March 2014, Cosco Capital Inc. led by retailer Lucio Co acquired NE Pacific Mall in an effort to expand their presence in Nueva Ecija. It is the only Pacific Mall that was not sold to the Metro Gaisano group.

Features 
Opened in April 1996, NE Pacific mall has a total gross floor area of an estimated 41,750 m2 (449,400 sq ft). It features more than 400 shops and restaurants. Throughout its existence, the mall served as one of the primary shopping centers of Cabanatuan and the entire province of Nueva Ecija.

The mall anchors the likes of NE Bakeshop and Restaurant and Puregold Store. The mall also features three cinemas, which includes a large format theater capable for 3D movies. It has many local and international store brands and food restaurants, including McDonalds, KFC; and Filipino fast food chains, Jollibee, Chowking, Mang Inasal, and Goldilocks. Government agencies have also established their offices within the mall such as PhilHealth, Social Security System (SSS), and Philippine Statistics Authority (PSA).

References 

Shopping malls established in 1996
Shopping malls in Nueva Ecija
Buildings and structures in Cabanatuan